Nikola Mazur (born 5 November 1995) is a Polish short track speed skater. She competed at the 2022 Winter Olympics, in Women's 3000 metre relay.

She was a student at the University of Gdańsk.

References 

1995 births
Living people
Polish female short track speed skaters
Olympic short track speed skaters of Poland
Short track speed skaters at the 2022 Winter Olympics